The Nebraska Cornhuskers men's golf team represents the University of Nebraska–Lincoln in the Big Ten Conference.  The program was established in 1935 and has made the NCAA championships four times, most recently in 1999. Five Cornhuskers have been named first-team all-conference selections, and in 1998 Steve Friesen won the Ben Hogan Award as the best golfer in the country.

The team has been coached by Judd Cornell since 2022.

Coaches

Coaching history

Coaching staff

Awards

Season-by-season results

Notes

References

Nebraska Cornhuskers golf